The 2022 Jack's World Series of Darts Finals was the eighth staging of the World Series of Darts Finals tournament, organised by the Professional Darts Corporation. The tournament took place at the AFAS Live, Amsterdam, Netherlands, from 16–18 September 2022. It featured a field of 24 players.

Jonny Clayton was the defending champion, after beating Dimitri Van den Bergh 11–6 in the 2021 final. However, he lost 8–11 to Dirk van Duijvenbode in the semi-finals.

Gerwyn Price won his second World Series Finals title, defeating van Duijvenbode 11–10 in the final.

Prize money
The prize money remained the same as the previous year.

Qualification
The top eight players from the six World Series events were seeded for this tournament.

Those events were:

2022 US Darts Masters
2022 Nordic Darts Masters
2022 Dutch Darts Masters
2022 Queensland Darts Masters
2022 New South Wales Darts Masters
2022 New Zealand Darts Masters

Eight additional players were invited by the PDC, with eight players qualifiying from a Tour Card Holder on August 6.

Draw
The draw was made on 7 September 2022.

References

World Series of Darts
World Series of Darts
+2022
World Series of Darts Finals